Ambulyx schauffelbergeri is a species of moth of the family Sphingidae first described by Otto Vasilievich Bremer and William Grey in 1853.

Description

References

Ambulyx
Moths described in 2005
Moths of Asia
Moths of Japan